The Veterans Memorial Bridge is a flyover that carries two lanes of traffic onto southbound US 319 (Capital Circle Northeast) from southbound U.S. Route 319/State Road 61 (Thomasville Road) on the north side of Tallahassee, Florida. It was built for the purpose of alleviating traffic congestion in the left-turn lanes on Thomasville Road and was opened to the public in 1997. A 2002 Florida state bill proposed that this bridge (number 550122) would be named Veterans Memorial Bridge.

References

Bridges completed in 1997
Buildings and structures in Tallahassee, Florida
Transportation in Tallahassee, Florida
Monuments and memorials in Florida
Road bridges in Florida
U.S. Route 19
Bridges of the United States Numbered Highway System
Transportation buildings and structures in Leon County, Florida